"Silent Sigh" is a single by British musical artist Badly Drawn Boy from the soundtrack to the film About a Boy. It reached number 16 in the UK Singles Chart.

Track listing

Cover versions 
 Polish singer Ania covered "Silent Sigh" on her 2010 album Ania Movie. The song was released as the final single off the album.
 A xylophone instrumental version of the song is featured on Children's TV show Something Special broadcast on the BBC channel CBeebies.

References

External links 
 

2002 singles
Badly Drawn Boy songs
Song recordings produced by Tom Rothrock
UK Independent Singles Chart number-one singles